Miyako Ko-ryū (都古流) is a Japanese school of ikebana that dates back to 1902 when it was formulated by Hajime Isogai. The name of the school was derived from a poem within the Kokin Wakashū.

The name means "old style of the capital", miyako being an old term for Kyoto, the previous capital city of Japan.

References

External links 

 Official homepage

Kadō schools